The 2008–09 Cymru Alliance was the nineteenth season of the Cymru Alliance after its establishment in 1990. The league was won by Bala Town.

League table

External links
Cymru Alliance

Cymru Alliance seasons
2008–09 in Welsh football leagues